The Council of People's Commissars of Belarus was established part of the governing apparatus of the Byelorussian Soviet Socialist Republic (BSSR). It was formed by the All-Byelorussian Congress of Soviets and functioned alongside the Central Executive Committee. Under the 1919 constitution the Council of People's Commissars belongs to the general management of the affairs of the BSSR. The Council of People's Commissars was empowered to issue decrees, orders and instructions, and to generally take whatever measures necessary for the proper and prompt management of the state. However any decisions of great general political importance were to be submitted for ratification by the Congress of Soviets, which could over-rule the decisions of the Council of People's Commissars.

People's Commissariats
According to the 1919 constitution, 15 People's Commissariats were established.
Foreign Affairs
Military Affairs,
Internal Affairs
Justice
Labour
Social Security
Public Education
Finance
Council of the National Economy,
Farming
Public communication
Health,
Workers and Peasants Inspection,
Food
Emergency Commission of Belarus.

See also 

 Council of People's Commissars of the Russian Soviet Federative Socialist Republic
 Council of People's Commissars of the Soviet Union

References

Byelorussian Soviet Socialist Republic
Government of Belarus